Krzysztof Antoni Klenczon (born 14 January 1942 in Pułtusk, Poland; died 7 April 1981 in Chicago) was a Polish composer, singer and guitarist, member of Czerwone Gitary (1965-1970), later Trzy Korony (1970-1972).

Composer of the greatest hits of the Red Guitars (next to Seweryn Krajewski) among others: Taka jak ty, Historia jednej znajomości, Nikt na świecie nie wie, Biały krzyż, Wróćmy na jeziora, Gdy kiedyś znów zawołam cię, Kwiaty we włosach, Powiedz stary gdzieś ty był, Jesień idzie przez park, and from Trzy Korony: 10 w skali Beauforta, Port, Czyjaś dziewczyna, Natalie-piękniejszy świat.

On 27 February 1981 Klenczon was seriously injured by a drunk driver in the suburbs of Chicago, on the way back from the Milford Ballroom in the city's Polish Village. He died on 7 April at St. Joseph's Hospital in Chicago, and was buried on 25 July 1981 in Szczytno, Poland on the family's plot,

Solo discography
 (1971) Krzysztof Klenczon i Trzy Korony
 (1977) The Show Never End
 (1978) Powiedz Stary Gdzieś Ty Był

External links
Krzysztof Klenczon Polish National Song Contest 
Stowarzyszenie Muzyczne Christopher 

1942 births
1981 deaths
People from Pułtusk
Road incident deaths in Illinois
Polish pop singers
Polish rock singers
20th-century Polish male singers